Bushra Iqbal Ansari is a Pakistani actress, comedian, singer and playwright who started her career as a child performer in the 1950s. Ansari won numerous awards during her career, including the Presidential Pride of Performance Award in 1989 for her contributions to the arts of Pakistan.

Career
Ansari's first dramatic acting role was in one of Iqbal Ansari's productions. She also appeared on PTV's most-watched shows, including Angan Terha, Show Time, Show Sha, Rang Tarang, Emergency Ward and the sketch comedy TV series Fifty Fifty.

Filmography

Film

Telefilm

Selected television

|-
|2023
|Tere Bin
|Maa Begum
|-

Awards and honors 

6th PTV Awards Best Actress Award for Raat Gaye in 1986
Iconic Women from Pakistan at Hum Women Leader Awards
On 23 March 2021, she was awarded the Sitara-e-Imtiaz for her contribution to Arts during the annual civil awards conferred by the President of Pakistan.

Lux Style Awards

References

External links

  
 
 Bushra Ansari Breaks Silence on her Divorce From Iqbal Ansari

Pakistani stage actresses
Pakistani television actresses
Pakistani television producers
Pakistani dramatists and playwrights
Pakistani women comedians
Recipients of the Pride of Performance
Lahore College for Women University alumni
Living people
Pakistani voice actresses
20th-century Pakistani actresses
21st-century Pakistani actresses
1956 births
Women television producers
Recipients of Sitara-i-Imtiaz
20th-century Pakistani women singers
PTV Award winners
21st-century Pakistani women singers